Ever Glory may refer to

Ever Glory Publishing, a Taiwanese publisher
, a Singaporean steamship